The 2006 Northern Ireland Trophy was the 2006 edition of the Northern Ireland Trophy snooker tournament, held from 13 to 20 August 2006, at the Waterfront Hall, Belfast, Northern Ireland. Ding Junhui defeated Ronnie O'Sullivan by nine  to six (9–6) in the final to lift his third ranking title whilst still a teenager. In the semi-finals, Ding defeated Stephen Lee 6–1, and O'Sullivan beat Dominic Dale 6–0. O'Sullivan made the highest  with his 140. The defending champion, Matthew Stevens, lost in round 3. The tournament, consisting of the top 32 and 16 qualifiers, was the first of seven WPBSA ranking events in the 2006/2007 season, preceding the Grand Prix.

Tournament summary
The Northern Ireland Trophy was first staged in 2005 at the Waterfront Hall, Belfast, Northern Ireland, as a non-ranking tournament featuring the top 16 and four wildcards, generally Irish. In the following year, it was granted ranking status and took the form of a regular tournament.

The 2006 tournament was the first of seven World Professional Billiards and Snooker Association (WPBSA) ranking events in the 2006/2007 season, preceding the Grand Prix, and the first event since last season's World Championship won by Graeme Dott, who defeated Peter Ebdon 18–14 in the final. The defending champion was Matthew Stevens, who defeated Stephen Hendry 9–7 in the previous year's final. Going into the tournament, Joe Swail, provisionally ranked number 13, said he was targeting a place in the top 16; and Dott, the World Champion, said interest in his results would increase, and that he felt capable of winning more tournaments. Shaun Murphy, the 2005 World Champion, said the pressure would be off him in the 2006/2007 season.

Qualifying
The qualifying stage took place between players ranked from 33 to 48 and those lower for one of 16 places in the final stage between 29 and 31 July 2006 at Pontin's Snooker Centre, Prestatyn, Wales. The matches were best-of-9 frames until the semi-finals. Successful qualifiers in this round included Northern Irish player Mark Allen, who defeated Tom Ford 5–3, and said the Waterfront—where he made his professional debut last year—was the best venue he had played at. Gerard Greene defeated Judd Trump 5–2, and Dominic Dale beat Dermot McGlinchey 5–1. Jimmy White, who had slipped from 8th to 35th in the rankings, lost 3–5 to Jimmy Michie, and said he was "match-shy" rather than nervous. Irish players Joe Delaney and Fergal O'Brien lost to Rod Lawler and Paul Davies respectively, both 3–5.

Round 1
In round 1 the 16 qualifiers went through to face players ranked 17–32. Swail lost 1–5 to Greene, who said the crowd was on his opponent's side. Tied at 3–3 Mark Selby won the seventh frame after Tony Drago missed a pink, eventually winning the match 5–4. Jamie Burnett made breaks of 117, 77, and 55 in defeating David Gray 5–2. Allen lost 1–5 to Ryan Day, a match in which Day made breaks of 79, 73, 56, and 91, after which Day said, "as soon as I started knocking in some breaks they went a bit quiet", in reference to the crowd. Michael Holt lost 2–5 to Mike Dunn, a player ranked 34 places below him. James Wattana defeated Michie 5–4 in a match that lasted over three hours. Michie was 1–3 down but went on to lead 4–3 and 30–0 points before he missed a straightforward pot, eventually losing the frame. Michie had the first chance in the next but also lost that frame. Tian Pengfei, on his 19th birthday, made breaks of 50, 62, and 115 in defeating Andy Hicks.

Final
In the best-of-17 final Ding defeated O'Sullivan to lift his third ranking title whilst still a teenager.

Prize fund 
The breakdown of prize money for this year is shown below:
 Winner: £30,000
 Final: £15,000
 Semi-final: £7,500
 Quarter-final: £5,600
 Last 16: £4,000
 Last 32: £2,500
 Last 48: £1,625
 Last 64: £1,100

Main draw

References

Sources 
 Draw . Sporting Life (UK). Retrieved 14 October 2010.
 "Northern Ireland Trophy 2006". Snooker.org. Retrieved 8 October 2010.
 "2006 Northern Ireland Trophy Results Grid". snookerdatabase.co.uk (Snooker Database). Retrieved 14 October 2010.
 "World Rankings 2006/2007". snooker.org. Retrieved 8 October 2010.

Northern Ireland Trophy
Northern Ireland Trophy
Trophy
Northern Ireland Trophy